Die Landstreicher ("The Tramps") is a German-language operetta in one prologue and two acts by Carl Michael Ziehrer (libretto by Leopold Krenn and Karl Lindau). It was first performed on 26 July 1899, at the summer theatre "Venedig in Wien", with Ludmilla Gaston as von Rodenstein, Franz Glawatsch, Rudolf del Zopp, Siegmund Steiner, Poldi Augustin, Anton Matschegg, Vali Paak, and Max Schönau.

The premiere was just three weeks after the death of Johann Strauss II. Despite the Viennese mourning for their beloved composer, the operetta was especially noted for its 'Viennese' spirit and more so with Ziehrer himself conducting, the review from the press was favorable with Ziehrer heralded as a new composer to usher in a new age.

Roles

Film versions
A film was made in 1937 directed by Karel Lamač with a script by Géza von Cziffra. It starred Paul Hörbiger, Rudolf Carl, Lucie Englisch, Erika Drusovich and Rudolf Platte. Further film versions were made for the Austrian boadcaster ORF in 1960 and again in 1968 in a co-production of ORF and the German broadcaster ZDF.

References

External links

Operas by Karl Michael Ziehrer
German-language operettas
1899 operas